Anahit Misak Kasparian (born July 7, 1986) is an American progressive political commentator, media host, and journalist. She is the main host and a producer of the online news show The Young Turks, having begun working as a fill-in producer for the show in 2007. She also appeared on the television version of the show that aired on Current TV. She formerly hosted The Point on the TYT Network and currently co-hosts a Jacobin YouTube show, Weekends with Ana Kasparian and Nando Vila.

Early life and education
Kasparian is the daughter of Armenian immigrant parents. Her paternal great-grandparents experienced the Armenian genocide first-hand in 1915. She was raised in the Reseda neighborhood of Los Angeles. She grew up speaking Armenian as her first language and started kindergarten without being able to speak a word of English. She has said watching Sesame Street as a child is what helped her to learn English quickly. She danced ballet from the age of three to the age of 19 and performed ballet professionally throughout those years. 

Kasparian graduated from Valley Alternative Magnet High School of Van Nuys in 2004 and California State University, Northridge (CSUN) in 2007 with a Bachelor of Arts in journalism. She completed her Master of Political Science in 2010.

Personal life
In November 2015, Kasparian married Minor League Baseball player, model, and actor Christian Lopez.

Journalism
Kasparian said that seeing journalist Barbara Walters on 20/20 inspired her to get into journalism. After graduating with a Bachelor of Arts, Journalism (BAJ) from California State University, Northridge (CSUN), she became an assistant producer with CBS Radio news stations in Los Angeles, first with KFWB and then KNX. She said that she was lucky to be hired immediately after graduating, but did not like working for CBS Radio because mainstream media is "not fun" due to the "robotic work environment" where she could not say what she wanted on air or do stories that were important to her. She enrolled in a master's degree program as a "way out" of media. She has also worked with AOL News, YouTube, TidalTv and On Point.

After filling in as host in April 2007, Kasparian became the producer and co-host with Cenk Uygur of the progressive talk radio on Sirius XM Satellite Radio and internet show/TV show The Young Turks. She was at first skeptical of her new work environment as an Armenian, saying: "The Young Turks is a strange name," but after working there the name was explained to her as: "it essentially means rebels. People who rebel against societal expectations." She liked working at The Young Turks enough that she decided to stay in media. In fact, she was supposed to leave after two weeks but said she "kind of refused". She was first hired to do marketing but "weaseled" her way into doing on-air segments. Kasparian described what she liked about working at TYT: "What I loved about the show was that it was unscripted. It was raw. It was just completely unfiltered." In a Forbes interview she also stated that she cannot pretend to be a "robot that's always neutral." She needs to state her opinion and sometimes "aggressively so" and TYT allowed her to do that.

She posits that young people are interested in news, but "they see network anchors as simply folks who read tele-prompters." This is why she believes young people are attracted to online media because there are fewer tele-prompters and people are more genuine. Kasparian and her co-host Uygur applied a populist left branding strategy that made TYT a successful global online organisation, with larger numbers of YouTube subscribers than several other notable news networks like CNN. She co-hosted TYT University, a show focused on issues faced by university students that ran from March 15, 2011, to December 31, 2014, where she first hosted with Jayar Jackson and then John Iadarola. TYT University then turned into a show called Think Tank debuting on January 1, 2015, with different hosts and different topics but aimed at the same demographic. The show was hosted by John Iadarola and Hannah Cranston. 

She was the main host of another TYT Network show, The Point, which was a panel style show with a weekly round up of news stories. Common co-hosts on The Point included political commentator Dave Rubin, science communicator Cara Santa Maria, American actor Hank Chen, and American football player Drew Carter. However, this show came to a close by releasing its last episode on January 5, 2016. She became a part-time journalist and op-ed writer at The Raw Story news outlet in May 2015. Kasparian appeared on "Take Part Live" several times in 2014, sometimes as a guest and sometimes as a co-host. She also is a weekly host on the Jacobin YouTube show Weekends, formerly co-hosted by Michael Brooks until his sudden death in July 2020.

Kasparian became a lecturer (i.e. instructor) at California State University, Northridge and began teaching journalism in August 2013.

"The Young Turks" naming discussion
The Young Turks name is identical to that of a Turkish political movement responsible for the Armenian genocide. Armenian activists have criticized the program's name and a spokesman for the Armenian National Committee of America has compared it to a hypothetical show broadcasting under the name "The Young Nazis".

In 2016, Kasparian became involved in an exchange over the name with hecklers from the Armenian Youth Federation during an appearance at California State University, Northridge. Kasparian's appearance at a 2017 event at UCLA was protested by the UCLA Armenian Students' Association which issued a statement saying that the "Bruin Political Union and Campus Events Commission have shown that they are either not familiar with the offensive nature of the name of the organization Mrs. Kasparian represents or that they just do not care". A 2018 Playboy article by Art Tavana on the name dispute  accused Kasparian of "complicity" in what he called "genocide denial". Kasparian has said that criticism of the name has led to harassment of her; in a 2020 Twitter exchange, she accused a critic of the name of perpetuating "the same lies over and over again, which of course directs harassment and disinformation toward me".

Political views

Kasparian has described herself as an atheist who pushes for progressive values. She wants criminal justice reform and has been a critic of private and for-profit prisons, calling them "hideous institutions". She argues that these institutions create a financial incentive to keep more people in prison for longer periods of time, rather than working to rehabilitate and reintegrate them into society. She also points out that these prisons often provide substandard conditions and inadequate services and may be less accountable to the public than government-run facilities. 

She has spoken out about campaign finance reform which is meant to get money out of politics. In December 2016, she gave a TEDx talk on this subject explaining a path that could be taken to achieve campaign finance reform, measures such as limiting the amount of money that individuals and organizations can contribute to political campaigns, increasing transparency and disclosure requirements for campaign spending, and implementing public financing systems for political campaigns.  

She believes in free education for the United States and affordable housing and her notion is based on the principle that access to education should be a basic right for all citizens, regardless of their socio-economic background, as well as everyone should have access to decent, safe, and affordable housing. 

During an appearance on The Nightly Show with Larry Wilmore in November 2015 she said, "people do stupid and offensive things all the time, and we can't expect to be shielded from it." 

She wrote-in Bernie Sanders in the 2020 presidential election, reasoning that it would not matter because she lives in the reliably Democratic-voting California.

See also
 History of Armenian Americans in Los Angeles

References

External links

TYT Network
Cary Osborne (3 February 2016). Anti-Establishment Truth Teller Kasparian Makes Forbes 30 Under 30. CSUN Today.

1986 births
American political commentators
American radio producers
American web producers
American talk radio hosts
American YouTubers
American media critics
Current TV people
Lecturers
The Young Turks people
California State University, Northridge alumni
California State University, Northridge faculty
Commentary YouTubers
People from Reseda, Los Angeles
Liberalism in the United States
News YouTubers
American women radio presenters
American atheists
American secularists
American people of Armenian descent
Left-wing politics in the United States
Progressivism in the United States
Living people
21st-century American journalists
Women radio producers